Columbia Park or Columbia Avenue Grounds was a baseball park in Philadelphia. It was built in 1901 as the first home of the Philadelphia Athletics, who played there for eight seasons, including two games of the 1905 World Series.

Columbia Park fell into disuse after the Athletics' move in 1909 to the larger Shibe Park, and was demolished in the 1910s.

Home of the Philadelphia Athletics
 
 
During their tenure at Columbia Park, the Athletics won the American League pennant twice. The first time was in 1902, before the institution of the modern World Series. 

Columbia Park was built in 1901 by the Philadelphia Athletics when the team was established, in the creation of the American League.  The site was a vacant lot on which manager and part-owner Connie Mack obtained a ten-year lease. It occupied the block bordered by North 29th Street, West Oxford Street, North 30th Street, and Columbia Avenue (later renamed Cecil B. Moore Avenue, in honor of the civil rights leader). 

The park was built by contractor James B. Foster, at a cost of $35,000. In contrast to the Phillies' Philadelphia Ball Park built in 1887 and rebuilt in 1894 with non-union labor, the Athletics employed exclusively union labor in Columbia Park's 1901 construction. This drew the praise of Philadelphia's union leaders who declared in April 1901, "[we] welcome [the Athletics] amongst us as brother unionists, and promise them our support and assistance, and bespeak or them the hearty goodwill, favor and patronage of all self-respecting citizens of Philadelphia.

The stadium was small and originally had a seating capacity of only 9,500. This was increased to 13,600 by the addition of bleacher seating in the outfield.  During some sold out games, unofficial additional seating could be found on top of the adjoining homes.  There was only one dressing room, for the home team; visiting teams had to change at their hotels. Although the ballpark was in Philadelphia's Brewerytown section, beer sales were prohibited.

The A's practiced at the park for the first time on April 5, 1901, with 600 fans in attendance. The first game at the ballpark was on April 8, 1901; the A's defeated Frank Moss' Professionals 8–1 in front of 1,000 fans on a cold and bleak day. Bill Bernhard started for the Athletics and his first pitch to Arlie Latham was a strike. 

The first official game in Columbia Park was held on April 26, 1901, after the first two games were rained out.  The Athletics played the Washington Senators in front of a crowd of 10,524, with some fans standing on the outfield walls and the roofs of nearby houses.  The Athletics lost 5–1, despite three hits by second baseman Nap Lajoie.

Following their successful 1902 season, the Athletics built a narrow upper deck on the rooftop of the ballpark.

The Phillies' Philadelphia Ball Bark had suffered a fatal collapse of its left field bleachers in 1903. Prior to the 1905 season, the Athletics reinforced Columbia Park's seating and grandstands with heavy yellow pine joists which received the approval of the City of Philadelphia's Chief of the Bureau of Building Inspections.

The Athletics won their second pennant in 1905, and faced the New York Giants in the 1905 World Series. The Giants won the series 4 games to 1. Games 1 and 3 were held at Columbia Park. Both were shutout victories for Giants future hall of famer Christy Mathewson.

The Athletics reconstructed the left and right bleachers prior to the 1906 season. The bleachers had previously run straight from the grandstand along 30th Street to Columbia Avenue. They were angled in such way that spectators at the Columbia Avenue end were unable to see the infield over fans in front of them. The club rebuilt the bleachers in a semi-circle, the seats reaching to the left field foul line and facing the infield and home plate, using heavy Florida yellow pine timber.

Other teams
The Philadelphia Phillies temporarily called Columbia Park home in 1903 while Baker Bowl was repaired after a balcony collapse on August 8, 1903. The Phillies played sixteen games at Columbia Park in August and September 1903.

The stadium also briefly served as the home of the Philadelphia Athletics football club, before the team folded in 1902.

The Athletics leased the ballpark to the independent Negro league club the Philadelphia Giants. The Giants played at the ballpark while the Athletics were on the road. The Giants were the first club to play night baseball in Philadelphia when they played under portable lights on June 4, 1902.

Disuse and demolition
The final game played at the park took place on October 3, 1908; the visiting Boston Americans defeated the Athletics 5–0 in the second game of a doubleheader.  The lack of seating at Columbia Park was the main reason the Athletics left for Shibe Park.  The sod from Columbia Park was transplanted to Shibe Park after the 1908 season.

After the Athletics left, the park was almost entirely abandoned.  Columbia Park was eventually demolished in the 1910s to make way for new homes.

References

External links

PhiladelphiaAthletics.org: Columbia Park was the first home of the Athletics
Ballparks.com: Columbia Park

Defunct Major League Baseball venues
Defunct sports venues in Philadelphia
Demolished sports venues in Pennsylvania
Philadelphia Athletics stadiums
Baseball venues in Pennsylvania
National Football League (1902) venues
1901 establishments in Pennsylvania
Sports venues completed in 1901
1910s disestablishments in Pennsylvania
Sports venues demolished in 1912